Ambient 2: Imaginary Landscapes is a 1993 compilation album released on the Virgin Records label, part of its Ambient series. The compilation was issued as a double CD.

Track listing
Source: Allmusic

References

1993 compilation albums
Virgin Records compilation albums
Ambient compilation albums